George Gavan Duffy (21 October 1882 – 10 June 1951) was an Irish politician, barrister and judge who served as President of the High Court from 1946 to 1951, a Judge of the High Court from 1936 to 1951 and Minister for Foreign Affairs from January 1922 to July 1922. He served as a Teachta Dála
(TD) for the Dublin County constituency from 1921 to 1923. He served as a Member of Parliament (MP) for the South Dublin constituency from 1918 to 1921.

Family
George Gavan Duffy was born at Rose Cottage, Rock Ferry, Cheshire, England, in 1882, the son of Charles Gavan Duffy and his third wife, Louise (née Hall). His half-brother Sir Frank Gavan Duffy (1852–1936) was the fourth Chief Justice of the High Court of Australia, sitting on the bench of the High Court from 1913 to 1935.

His sister Louise Gavan Duffy came to Ireland in 1907, taught in Patrick Pearse's St Ita's school for girls Scoil Íde, was, with Mary Colum first Secretary of Cumann na mBan, and was out in the Easter Rising of 1916, in the GPO and Jacob's garrisons. She founded and ran Scoil Bhríde, a bilingual school in Dublin, which is still in operation. Louise came originally to Dublin, as her mother died in 1889.  George was raised by three half-sisters travelling from Austria and Germany, at Guilloy, Nice, France. He spoke fluent Italian and French received education from Petit Seminaire. From there he was sent to Stonyhurst College.

He qualified with a solicitor's firm in London in 1907. He married Margaret Sullivan, on 13 December 1908. They had two children, a son (Colum) and a daughter (Máire). Colum Duffy was a legal scholar and law librarian at the Law Society of Ireland.

Early career
Gavan Duffy qualified as a solicitor and practised in London. He defended Sir Roger Casement at his trial for high treason after the Easter Rising. Although the case was unsuccessful and Casement executed, the trial had an enormous effect on Gavan Duffy and in 1917, when he was called to the Irish Bar, he came to live in King's Inns, Dublin, where he became immersed in Irish political life.

Political life

Recognition efforts

During the 1918 Westminster election, he was elected as a Sinn Féin MP for South Dublin.

He was sent to Paris to join Seán T. O'Kelly, as an envoy of the newly declared Irish Republic. Gavan Duffy published articles and pamphlets urging recognition of Ireland as a sovereign nation at the Paris Peace Conference, which caused increasing embarrassment to the French establishment, who believed his publications were damaging Anglo-French relations.

Gavan Duffy and O'Kelly sought France's help against Britain when the treaties ending the First World War had not yet been signed; Britain had been France's main ally for most of the war, in which France had suffered enormous losses. In January 1919, Irish Republican Army had also started the Irish War of Independence against Britain, and the new Dáil had declared independence from the United Kingdom.

Further, the British position was that it was preparing a revised system of Irish Home Rule which would be effected after the Peace Conference, and that it had tried to solve the Irish Question at the Irish Convention in 1917, which Sinn Féin had boycotted. Sinn Féin had joined in the campaign against conscription in 1918.

In consequence all the Allies of World War I saw the Sinn Féin movement as more or less hostile. A final letter of June 1919 demanding recognition and addressed to the French Prime Minister Georges Clemenceau, the chairman of the Peace Conference, was not replied to.

Finally, after publishing a letter he had sent to Clemenceau in protest against the former mistreatment of Terence MacSwiney in prison in 1917, Gavan Duffy was banished from Paris. He was declared persona non grata in December 1920. He then went to Rome and from there travelled through Europe on behalf of the Ministry of the Irish Republic, without securing its recognition.

Anglo-Irish Treaty

When Éamon de Valera chose his plenipotentiaries to negotiate the Anglo-Irish Treaty in 1921; Gavan Duffy was chosen due mainly to his legal expertise. He protested against signing the Treaty but did so reluctantly, becoming the last person to sign. During the debates which followed in Dáil Éireann, Gavan Duffy stated that he would recommend the Treaty reluctantly but sincerely as he saw no alternative for the desired aim of independence.

I do not love this treaty now any more than I loved it when I signed it, that I do not think that...is an adequate motive for rejection to point out that some of us signed the Treaty under duress, not to say that this treaty will not lead to permanent peace.  It is necessary before you reject the Treaty to go further than that and to produce to the people of Ireland a rational alternative.  My heart is with those who are against the Treaty, but my reason is against them, because I can see no rational alternative.

Gavan Duffy placed the onus on the people who were responsible for drafting the Constitution of the Irish Free State to frame it in accordance with the terms of the Treaty. He disagreed, however, with Griffith's decision to show the draft constitution to British Prime Minister Lloyd George who immediately ordered that references to the King had to be inserted as well as an Oath of Allegiance. Lloyd George threatened to start a war if the Irish refused to sign; but Gavan Duffy did not believe it.

On 21 December 1921, he gave his main reason for supporting the treaty in the Dail, the impact of a potentially renewed war on the people, concluding:
You may gamble on the prospects of a renewal of that horrible war, which I for one have only seen from afar, but which I know those who have so nobly withstood do not wish to see begun again without a clear prospect of getting further than they are to-day. We are told that this is a surrender of principle. If that be so, we must be asked to believe that every one of those who have gone before us in previous fights, and who in the end have had to lay down their arms or surrender to avert a greater evil to the people, have likewise been guilty of a breach of principle. I do not think an argument of that kind will get you much further. No! The solid principle, the solid basis upon which every honest man ought to make up his mind on this issue, may be summed up in the principle that we all claimed when it was first enunciated by the President, the principle of government by the consent of the governed. I say that no serious person here, whatever his feelings, knowing as he must what the people of this country think of the matter, will be doing his duty if, under these circumstances, he refuses to ratify the Treaty. Ratify it with the most dignified protest you can, ratify because you cannot do otherwise, but ratify it in the interests of the people you must.

Resignations
This prompted him to resign but he was compelled to remain in office, serving as Minister for Foreign Affairs from January 1922 to July 1922. On the outbreak of the Irish Civil War he resigned when the Provisional Government refused to effect a court order for habeas corpus in favour of George Plunkett (a son of Count Plunkett), who was detained without charge with other republicans.

His tenure in office was cut short by his decision to resign again when the Executive Council of the Irish Free State abolished the Republican Courts and executed his good friend Erskine Childers.

He stood in the 1923 general election as an independent candidate but failed to be re-elected.

Barrister and judge

Gavan Duffy returned to the Irish Bar and built up a large practice and was engaged in some notable constitutional cases such as the Land Annuities controversy in which he claimed that the Irish Free State could not be bound either in honour or in law to hand over annuities to Britain. He was appointed Senior Counsel in 1930 and Judge of the High Court in 1936. He acted as an unofficial legal advisor to Éamon de Valera during the drafting of the 1937 Constitution of Ireland and was consulted on many issues pertaining to it. He was also a member of the commission to set up the second house of the Oireachtas, Seanad Éireann, in 1937. As president of the High Court he issues the ruling in State (Burke) v. Lennon that was upheld by the Supreme Court of Ireland.

In 1946, at the height of his legal career, he was appointed President of the High Court, a position he held for the rest of his life. He heard the controversial Tilson Case in 1950, one year before his death. His judgement applied the ne temere decree to the letter, as de Valera's 1937 Irish Constitution gave the Roman Catholic Church in Ireland a "special position". The Supreme Court of Ireland concurred but Gavan Duffy was criticised in some quarters for  his ruling.

At the time of his death, Duffy was writing a judgement in favour of Ernie O'Malley in a property case brought before the court of equity by O'Malley's estranged wife Helen Hooker. Although Duffy died before he could deliver judgement, Hooker decided not to pursue the case further.

He was a longstanding member of the Catholic organisation An Ríoghacht.

Death
George Gavan Duffy died in a nursing home in Leeson Street, Dublin, on 10 June 1951.

References

External links
Golding, G.M. George Gavan Duffy 1882–1951: a legal biography (Dublin, 1982)
Gavan-Duffy's speech on 21 Dec 1921, pp.86–89
Letter to Clemenceau demanding recognition,  June 1919
 

1882 births
1951 deaths
Early Sinn Féin TDs
Ministers for Foreign Affairs (Ireland)
Members of the Parliament of the United Kingdom for County Dublin constituencies (1801–1922)
UK MPs 1918–1922
Members of the 1st Dáil
Members of the 2nd Dáil
Members of the 3rd Dáil
20th-century Irish lawyers
Irish barristers
Presidents of the High Court (Ireland)
Alumni of King's Inns